Szobotka Imre (Zalaegerszeg, 1890 September 3 - Budapest, 1961 May 24) was a Hungarian painter.

References 

1890 births
1961 deaths
20th-century Hungarian painters
People from Zalaegerszeg
Hungarian male painters
20th-century Hungarian male artists